Edwin Goodrich (March 22, 1843 – November 26, 1910) was a Union Army officer during the American Civil War.

He received the Medal of Honor for gallantry during the Battle of Cedar Creek fought near Middletown, Virginia on October 19, 1864. The battle was the decisive engagement of Major General Philip Sheridan's Valley Campaigns of 1864 and was the largest battle fought in the Shenandoah Valley.

Goodrich enlisted in the Army from Westfield, New York in November 1861. He was commissioned as an officer in February 1864, and mustered out with his regiment in July 1865.

Medal of Honor citation
“The President of the United States of America, in the name of Congress, takes pleasure in presenting the Medal of Honor to First Lieutenant Edwin Goodrich, United States Army, for extraordinary heroism on November, 1864, while serving with Company D, 9th New York Cavalry, in action at Cedar Creek, Virginia. While the command was falling back, First Lieutenant Goodrich returned, and in the face of the enemy rescued a sergeant from under his fallen horse.”

See also

List of Medal of Honor recipients
List of American Civil War Medal of Honor recipients: G-L

References

External links
Military Times Hall of Valor
Findagrave entry

1843 births
1910 deaths
Military personnel from New York City
People of New York (state) in the American Civil War
People of Illinois in the American Civil War
Union Army officers
United States Army Medal of Honor recipients
American Civil War recipients of the Medal of Honor